SH3 domain-binding protein 4 is a protein that in humans is encoded by the SH3BP4 gene.

This gene encodes a protein with 3 Asn-Pro-Phe (NPF) motifs, an SH3 domain, a PXXP motif, a bipartite nuclear targeting signal, and a tyrosine phosphorylation site. This protein is involved in cargo-specific control of clathrin-mediated endocytosis, specifically controlling the internalization of a specific protein receptor.

References

Further reading